Henry Bone  (6 February 1755 – 17 December 1834) was an English enamel painter who was officially employed in that capacity by three successive monarchs, George III, George IV and William IV. In his early career he worked as a porcelain and jewelry painter. He was elected a Royal Academician and produced the largest enamel paintings ever seen up to that time.

Life and work

Henry Bone was born in Truro, Cornwall. His father was a cabinet maker and carver of unusual skill. In 1767, Bone's family moved to Plymouth in neighbouring Devon, where Henry was apprenticed, in 1771, to William Cookworthy, the founder of the Plymouth porcelain works, and the first manufacturer of Hard-paste porcelain in England. In 1772, Bone moved, with his master, to the Bristol china works, where he remained for six years, working from 6 a.m. to 6 p.m., and studying drawing at night. His china decoration is of high merit, and is said to have been marked with the figure "1" in addition to the factory-mark, a small cross.

On the failure of the Bristol works in 1778, Bone came to London with one guinea of his own in his pocket, and five pounds borrowed from a friend. He first found employment enameling watches and fans, and afterwards in making enamel and watercolour portraits. He became a friend of John Wolcot, and, on his advice, made professional tours in Cornwall. On 24 January 1780, he married Elizabeth Vandermeulen, a descendant of the distinguished battle-painter Adam Frans van der Meulen. The couple went on to have twelve children, ten of whom survived. In the same year he exhibited his first picture at the Royal Academy, a portrait of his wife, an unusually large enamel for the period. He then gave himself up entirely to enamel-painting, and continued frequently to exhibit at the Academy, initialing most of his works.

In 1789, he exhibited "A Muse and Cupid", the largest enamel painting ever executed up to that time. In 1800 he was appointed enamel painter to the Prince of Wales; in 1801 he was made an associate of the Royal Academy (ARA) and enamel painter to George III, continuing to hold the appointment during the reigns of George IV and William IV. On 15 April 1811 he was elected a royal academician (RA), and shortly afterwards produced a still larger enamel (eighteen inches by sixteen), after Titian's Bacchus and Ariadne. More than 4000 people saw the work at Bone's house. The picture was sold to Mr. G. Bowles of Cavendish Square for 2,200 guineas, the sum of which was paid (either wholly or partly) by a cheque drawn on Fauntleroy's Bank. Bone cashed the cheque on his way home, just in time, as the next day financial difficulties caused the bank to suspend payments!

In the preparation and firing of his large plates, he was assisted by Edward Wedlake Brayley, who was by then already a distinguished antiquary, but had trained as an enameller.

Bone's next great works were a series of historical portraits from the time of Elizabeth I, a series of "Cavaliers distinguished in the Civil War", and a series of portraits of the Russell family. The Elizabethan series did not prove a financial success; they were exhibited at his house at 15 Berners Street. In 1831 his eyesight failed, and after having lived successively at Spa Fields, 195 High Holborn, Little Russell Street, Hanover Street, and Berners Street, he moved in that year to Somers Town, and reluctantly received the Royal Academy pension.

He died on 17 December 1834, not without complaining of the neglect with which he had latterly been treated. He is said to have been "a man of unaffected modesty and generosity; friendship and integrity adorned his private life". Francis Chantrey carved a bust of him, and John Opie, John Jackson, and George Harlow all painted his portrait. Richard Dagley was a friend.

Legacy
Some time before his death Bone offered his collections, which had been valued at £10,000, to the nation for £4,000, but the offer was declined, and on 22 April 1836 they were sold by auction at Christie's, and so dispersed. Other major sales of his works took place in 1846, 1850, 1854, and 1856.

Bone has been called the "Prince of Enamelers". J. Jope Rogers published a large catalogue of 1,063 works of the Bone family in the Journal of the Royal Institution of Cornwall, No. XXII, for March 1880 - half of which was taken up by works by Henry Bone.

Family
Two of his sons, Henry Pierce Bone and Robert Trewick Bone, were also notable enamellists. Another son, Thomas Bone, was a midshipman who was wrecked and drowned in a sloop called Racehorse off the Isle of Man, while yet another, Peter Bone, was a lieutenant in the 36th Regiment, who was wounded at the Battle of Toulouse and died soon after returning to England. A fifth son was called to the bar.

Gallery

References

Attribution

Further reading

Tregellas, Walter Hawken. Cornish Worthies, volume 1 pp. 159–166 (London: E. Stock, 1884).

External links

 
Henry Bone (ArtCyclopedia)
A pair of enamels (Christie's)

1755 births
1834 deaths
People from Truro
Artists from Plymouth, Devon
18th-century English painters
English male painters
19th-century English painters
Painters from Cornwall
Portrait miniaturists
Royal Academicians
English enamellers
18th-century enamellers
19th-century enamellers
19th-century English male artists
18th-century English male artists